Squeezebox Set is a five album box set containing studio albums eighteen to twenty-two by King Creosote, released in 2002. The wooden box is handmade and includes "Losing it on the gyles", "More Afraid of Plastic", "Whelk of Arse", "Favourite Girl" and "Fair Dubhs". The albums included are not available individually. The box set has been sold for upwards of £200."

Track listing

King Creosote's Losing It On The Gyles
The Sea Gyles     
Cowboys And Canyons       
Coyote Pups       
Sun-Soured Milk     
Home Again...       
...Safe?       
It's Not The Drink That I Love More      
Beguiles      
Your Young Voice     
Crailscapes     
The Gyles     
Julian's Unwitting Blues

More Afraid Of Plastic
Waashoot       
Please...Give...Me...Peace...       
Mooning      
Choke Madelaine       
Bad Harvest      
Soul Disintegration       
Voyeur       
Citrus Budgies     
Waving Your Right Arm     
Bad Bad Harvest    
Sea Rain      
Sleepy Quay       
Grabbing A Swan's Leg     
Untitled

Whelk Of Arse
Work Of Art    
Travis May Sue Your Ass   
My Favourite Girl In All The World     
Bootprints      
35cl       
Pinning The Tail On The Donkey    
Ding Dinio       
All At Sea     
Klutz      
Cohones     
Spokes      
Go Rimbaud Go      
The Importance Of Looking Right     
Scales Of The World     
The Coo's Tail      
Captain Geeko The Dead Aviator

King Creosote's Favourite Girl
Mon Dieux     
Little Heart, Littler Banjo   
Chest Of Drawers      
Please ... Give ... Me ... Pieces     
Karlsruhe       
Favourite Girl      
Toast Time       
Marguerita Bled Me Dry      
Travis May Sue Your Dirty Ass     
At The W.A.L.       
Crailway Station       
Little Death       
How Brave Was I?      
Kenny And Beth's Musacal Boat Rides

Fair Dubhs
Welcome    
Eggshell Miles       
Bathtime Maybe      
Skinny Dipping     
Clown       
Moon Barking      
Precious Daze       
Shame On Sherlock      
Insomniac      
Let La Guerre Begin Again       
Armistice     
Untitled

References

2002 compilation albums
King Creosote albums